Military Service Acts were introduced to enact conscription:
Military Service Act 1916, introduced in January 1916 in the UK during World War I
Military Service Act (Canada), introduced in Canada in 1917 during World War I
Military Service Act 1939, introduced in the United Kingdom in 1939 in the run-up to World War II
Military Service Act (South Korea), enacting conscription in South Korea
Military Service Act (Taiwan), enacting conscription in Taiwan

See also
Military Selective Service Act, in the United States
National Service Act (disambiguation)
Selective Service Act (disambiguation)